Char Asiab District (Chahār Aasiāb
Char Asiab, Chahar Asiab, Charasiab, Charasiah or Charasia) is a district, approximately 11 km (7 miles) south of the city of Kabul, and is situated in the southern part of Kabul province, Afghanistan. It has a population of 32,500 people (2002 official UNHCR estimate). The majority are Pashtuns, followed by Tajiks as well as a few Hazaras.

Char Asiab district borders Logar province to the south, Wardak province to the west, Paghman District to the north-west, Kabul to the north, and Bagrami and Mussahi districts to the west. The headquarters of Char Asiab district is Qala-e Malik, which is located in the western end of the district.

The Kabul River flows through Char Asiab district. Agriculture is the main source of income for the people. Even with a low water table in the summer, the land can be irrigated and cultivated. 

Around 1992 Char Asiab went through a period of distraction in the war in Afghanistan. At the time of the Mujahideen regime it was used as the main military base of Hezb-e-Islami Gulbudin.

References

External links 
Char Asiab District Map (Source: AIMS)

Districts of Kabul Province